William Duesbury (1763–1796), was the owner of Royal Crown Derby pottery works.

Biography
Duesbury was a son of William Duesbury (1725–1786) and the prosperity of the family pottery works (Royal Crown Derby) reached its highest point shortly after he succeeded to them. He took into partnership an Irish miniature-painter Michael Kean. Duesbury's health broke early, and he died in 1796.

Family
Duesbury and his wife, Elizabeth, daughter of William Edwards, a solicitor of Derby (who remarried the above-mentioned Kean), had three sons, of whom William Duesbury, born in 1787, inherited, but did not take part in the works, which in 1809 were disposed of to Robert Bloor. The second son, Frederick Duesbury, became a well-known physician in London, and was father of the architect Henry Duesbury.

Notes

References
 endnotes:
Haslem's Old Derby China Manufactory;
Jewitt's Ceramic Art of Great Britain;
Wallis and Bemrose's Pottery and Porcelain of Derbyshire.

1763 births
1796 deaths
English potters